Pedro Marçal (born 23 January 1938) is a Portuguese fencer. He competed in the individual foil event at the 1960 Summer Olympics.

References

External links
 

1938 births
Living people
Portuguese male foil fencers
Olympic fencers of Portugal
Fencers at the 1960 Summer Olympics